Measle and the Mallockee  is a children's novel written by Ian Ogilvy and illustrated by Chris Mould. It is the third book in the Measle Stubbs series. The novel was first published in 2005 by Oxford University Press in the UK and HarperCollins in the US.

Characters
Measle Stubbs/Sam Lee Stubbs - The main character in the book. A thin 10-year-old boy with a funny haircut.  His nickname 'Measle' is an anagram of his actual name Sam Lee, invented by his former guardian, Basil Tramplebone. 
Tinker - Measle's dog, who has helped him on a number of occasions.
Sam Stubbs - Measle's dad. He is also a wizard, although not an incredibly powerful one.
Lee Stubbs - Measle's mom. She is a manafount, which means that she, although unable to do spells herself, has an unlimited supply of mana which is what magicians use to cast spells. This mana can be tapped into either by her husband holding hands with her or by her being eaten.
Matilda Stubbs - Measle's Baby Sister.
Mallockee - A powerful force that need not say the spell to cast it. Like manafounts, they have an unlimited supply of mana.

References

2004 British novels
Children's fantasy novels
British children's novels
2004 children's books
Oxford University Press books